"Take You There" is the third single by Sean Kingston from his self-titled debut album. It was produced by J.R. Rotem. The song was co-written by Kingston, Rotem, Evan "Kidd" Bogart, Rock City, and Eric Bluebaum. The song is about Kingston taking his girlfriend on a date to the West Indies, particularly his native Jamaica. As he told noted UK urban writer Pete Lewis of Blues & Soul in June 2007: "In 'Take You There' I'm basically telling a girl 'Let me take you to where I'm from - to Jamaica, to the paradise and to the slums!'. Because, while many people just think of the tropical beaches, there is definitely another, rugged side to the island too!"

On the issue date of November 17, 2007 the single debuted on the Billboard Hot 100 at number 81 and peaked at number 7.

Music video
The video (directed Gil Green) was shot in Miami, and features cameos by Rick Ross, J. R. Rotem, DJ Khaled and Gunplay. Kingston's girlfriend is played by fashion model Kirby Griffin. In the music video version, "sip piña coladas" is censored because of the reference to alcohol, while left intact on radio stations.

Charts

Weekly charts

Year-end charts

Certifications

!scope="col" colspan="3"| Digital download
|-

!scope="col" colspan="3"| Ringtone
|-

References

2007 singles
2008 singles
Music videos directed by Gil Green
Sean Kingston songs
Song recordings produced by J. R. Rotem
Songs written by J. R. Rotem
Songs written by E. Kidd Bogart
Songs written by Sean Kingston
Songs written by Timothy Thomas
Songs written by Theron Thomas
2007 songs
Epic Records singles
MNRK Music Group singles